The Warbirds ASz-62 IR is a Czech aircraft engine, based on the Shvetsov ASh-62 and produced by Warbirds-engines (Cesky znalecky institut s.r.o.) of Prague for use in warbirds and homebuilt aircraft.

The company appears to have gone out of business by 2014.

Design and development
The ASz-62 IR engine is a nine-cylinder four-stroke two-stroke, radial,  displacement, air-cooled, direct-drive, gasoline engine  design, with a mechanical gearbox reduction drive. It employs dual magneto ignition and produces  at 2200 rpm, with a compression ratio of 6.4:1.

Specifications (ASz-62 IR)

See also

References

Warbirds-engines aircraft engines
Air-cooled aircraft piston engines
2010s aircraft piston engines
Aircraft air-cooled radial piston engines